Leonovka is a rural locality (a selo) in Kizhinginsky District, Republic of Buryatia, Russia. The population was 222 as of 2010. There are 2 streets.

Geography 
Leonovka is located 17 km southwest of Kizhinga (the district's administrative centre) by road. Edermeg is the nearest rural locality.

References 

Rural localities in Kizhinginsky District